Scott City is an extinct town in Atchison County, in the U.S. state of Missouri. The GNIS classifies it as a populated place, but the precise location of the town site is unknown. 

Scott City had the name of its founder, Margaret Scott. A variant name was North Star. A post office called North Star was established in 1857, and remained in operation until 1874.

References

Ghost towns in Missouri
Former populated places in Atchison County, Missouri
1857 establishments in Missouri